Uppala railway station (Code: UAA) is a railway station in Kasaragod district, Kerala and falls under the Palakkad railway division of the Southern Railway zone, Indian Railways.

References

 http://indiarailinfo.com/arrivals/uppala-uaa/2779

Palakkad railway division
Railway stations in Kasaragod district
Manjeshwar area